Gelliodes is a genus of sponges in the family Niphatidae.

Species

 Gelliodes bifacialis  Topsent, 1904
 Gelliodes biformis  Brøndsted, 1924
 Gelliodes callista  de Laubenfels, 1954
 Gelliodes carnosa  Dendy, 1889
 Gelliodes coscinopora  Lévi, 1969
 Gelliodes fayalensis  Topsent, 1892
 Gelliodes fibroreticulata  (Dendy, 1916)
 Gelliodes fibrosa  Dendy, 1905
 Gelliodes fibulata  (Carter, 1881)
 Gelliodes fragilis  Desqueyroux-Faúndez, 1984
 Gelliodes gracilis  Hentschel, 1912
 Gelliodes incrustans  Dendy, 1905
 Gelliodes leucosolenia  de Laubenfels, 1934
 Gelliodes licheniformis  (Lamarck, 1814)
 Gelliodes luridus  (Lundbeck, 1902)
 Gelliodes macrosigma  Hentschel, 1912
 Gelliodes nossibea  Lévi, 1956
 Gelliodes obtusa  Hentschel, 1912
 Gelliodes persica  Fromont, 1995
 Gelliodes petrosioides  Dendy, 1905
 Gelliodes poculum  Ridley & Dendy, 1886
 Gelliodes porosa  Thiele, 1903
 Gelliodes pumila  (Lendenfeld, 1887)
 Gelliodes ramosa  Kieschnick, 1898
 Gelliodes spinosella  Thiele, 1899
 Gelliodes spongiosa  Topsent, 1916
 Gelliodes strongylofera  Brøndsted, 1924
 Gelliodes tenuirhabdus  Pulitzer-Finali, 1982
 Gelliodes truncata  (Kieschnick, 1896)
 Gelliodes tubulosa  Lendenfeld, 1887
 Gelliodes wilsoni  Carballo, Aquilar-Camacho, Knapp & Bell, 2013

References 

Haplosclerida
Sponge genera
Taxa named by Stuart Oliver Ridley